Jahan Tigh (also Romanized as Jahān Tīgh; also known as Jahān Tīghābād) is a village in Qoroq Rural District, Baharan District, Gorgan County, Golestan Province, Iran. At the 2006 census, its population was 1,129, in 257 families.

References 

Populated places in Gorgan County